Aepypodius is a genus of birds in the family Megapodiidae.

It contains the following species:

References

 
Bird genera
Taxonomy articles created by Polbot